One third of the Norwich City Council in Norfolk, England is elected each year, followed by one year without election. Since the last boundary changes in 2019, 39 councillors have been elected from 13 wards.

Political control
Since the first elections to the council in 1973 under the new system brought in by the Local Government Act 1972, political control of the council has been held by the following parties:

Leadership

The role of Lord Mayor of Norwich is largely ceremonial, and is generally held by a different person each year. Political leadership is provided instead by the leader of the council. The leaders since 1974 have been:

Council elections
1973 Norwich City Council election
1976 Norwich City Council election
1979 Norwich City Council election (New ward boundaries)
1980 Norwich City Council election
1982 Norwich City Council election
1983 Norwich City Council election
1984 Norwich City Council election
1986 Norwich City Council election
1987 Norwich City Council election
1988 Norwich City Council election
1990 Norwich City Council election
1991 Norwich City Council election
1992 Norwich City Council election
1994 Norwich City Council election
1995 Norwich City Council election
1996 Norwich City Council election
1998 Norwich City Council election
1999 Norwich City Council election
2000 Norwich City Council election
2002 Norwich City Council election
2003 Norwich City Council election
2004 Norwich City Council election (New ward boundaries reduced the number of seats by 9)
2006 Norwich City Council election
2007 Norwich City Council election
2008 Norwich City Council election
2010 Norwich City Council election (By-elections in all 13 wards were held in September following a High Court ruling) 
2011 Norwich City Council election
2012 Norwich City Council election
2014 Norwich City Council election
2015 Norwich City Council election
2016 Norwich City Council election
2018 Norwich City Council election
2019 Norwich City Council election (New ward boundaries)
2021 Norwich City Council election

Result maps

By-election results

The political make up of the council, following the by-elections held on 19 December 2012, was: Labour 21 seats, Green 15, Liberal Democrat 3, Conservative 0.

Notes

References

External links
Norwich Council

 
Council elections in Norfolk
Elections in Norwich
District council elections in England